Gunter Schmieder (born 27 July 1957 in Marienberg) is an East German nordic combined skier who competed from 1976 to 1984. He won a gold medal in the 3 x 10 km team event at the 1982 FIS Nordic World Ski Championships in Oslo and finished fifth in the 15 km individual event in the same world championships in 1978 and 1982.

Schmieder finished 8th in the individual event at the 1980 Winter Olympics and 15th in the same event at the 1984 Winter Olympics. He won two individual events in his career; in 1976 and in 1977.

External links

German male Nordic combined skiers
Nordic combined skiers at the 1980 Winter Olympics
Nordic combined skiers at the 1984 Winter Olympics
Olympic Nordic combined skiers of East Germany
1957 births
Living people
FIS Nordic World Ski Championships medalists in Nordic combined
People from Marienberg
Sportspeople from Saxony